The Men's 60 metres hurdles event at the 2013 European Athletics Indoor Championships was held at March 1, 2013 at 10:30 (round 1), 18:05 (semi-final) and 19:45 (final) local time.

Records

Results

Round 1
Qualification: First 3 (Q) or and the 4 fastest athletes (q) advanced to the final.

Semi-final 

Qualification: First 4 (Q) advanced to the final.

Final 
The final was held at 19:45.

References

60 metres hurdles at the European Athletics Indoor Championships
2013 European Athletics Indoor Championships